Raymond Taavel (June 9, 1962 – April 17, 2012) was a Canadian LGBTQ rights activist who was attacked and killed by Andre Noel Denny on April 17, 2012 outside Menz Bar, Gottingen Street while protecting another person. He was thereafter posthumously awarded the Queen Elizabeth II Diamond Jubilee medal. He played a key role in the Halifax Regional Municipality (HRM)’s first ever Pride Week publication. He worked toward having the rainbow flag raised at Halifax City Hall. During his lifetime he also engaged in endeavors to legitimize equal marriage and transgender rights in Nova Scotia’s Human Rights Act. In 2017, the Department of Heritage and Culture Committee of the Halifax Regional Council selected Taavel as one of 30 Nova Scotians from the last century-and-a-half to be celebrated in the Vanguard exhibition at the Nova Scotia Museum for his “innovation and change in the face of diversity.” In 2019 Inglis Street Park was renamed the Raymond Taavel Park in his honor.

References

1962 births
2012 deaths
Canadian LGBT rights activists
Deaths by beating
Canadian LGBT journalists
Murdered Canadian journalists